Scooby-Doo is the eponymous character and protagonist of the animated television franchise, created in 1969 by the American animation company Hanna-Barbera. He is a male Great Dane and lifelong companion of amateur detective Shaggy Rogers, with whom he shares many personality traits. He features a mix of both canine and human behaviors (reminiscent of other talking animals in Hanna-Barbera's series), and is treated by his friends more or less as an equal. Scooby often speaks in a rhotacized way, substituting the first letters of many words with the letter 'r'. His catchphrase is "Scooby-Dooby-Doo!"

History
Writers Joe Ruby and Ken Spears created the original Scooby-Doo series, Scooby-Doo, Where Are You! for Hanna-Barbera, as a part of CBS's 1969–1970 Saturday morning cartoon schedule. Originally titled Mysteries Five, the dog who later became Scooby was originally more of a sidekick character – a bongo-playing dog named "Too Much" whose breed varied between Great Dane and sheepdog between treatments.

By the time the series was pitched to the network as Who's S-S-Scared? in early 1969, Too Much was solidified as a cowardly Great Dane. Both the dog and the series would be renamed Scooby-Doo by Fred Silverman, CBS's head of daytime programming, between its unsuccessful first pitch and a second pitch, which earned the show a green light. Silverman stated that he came up with the name from the syllables "doo-be-doo-be-doo" in Frank Sinatra's hit song "Strangers in the Night". Though a similar name was featured in the title of the single "Feelin' So Good (S.K.O.O.B.Y.-D.O.O.)" released just a few months earlier in 1968 by The Archies, a fictional band from the CBS series The Archie Show was also overseen by Silverman. Also a character in an unsold TV pilot Swingin' Together, broadcast in 1963 on CBS, is named Skooby-doo.

Taking notes from a Hanna-Barbera colleague who was also a breeder of Great Danes, production designer Iwao Takamoto designed the Scooby-Doo character with a sloping chin, spots, a long tail, a sloped back, and bow legs – all traits in direct opposition to those of a prize-winning purebred Great Dane. In defining the personality of the dog, Ruby and Spears looked for inspiration to the characters played by Bob Hope in his horror-comedies – a coward who shows traits of bravery when his friends are in danger. Veteran Hanna-Barbera voice artist Don Messick was the original voice of Scooby and spent decades working on the character.

Scooby-Doo, Where Are You! premiered on CBS on September 13, 1969, at 10:30 a.m. Eastern Time. It ran for two seasons, with a total of 25 episodes. Its final first-run episode aired on October 31, 1970.

Personality
In most incarnations of the series, Scooby is regarded as a unique Great Dane dog who is able to speak in broken English, and usually puts the letter "R" in front of words and noises made. Other incarnations, such as A Pup Named Scooby-Doo, present him as a speech-impaired dog in the larger fictional universe as nobody in Coolsville seems bothered by his speaking ability. In recent years (most notably in Scooby-Doo! Mystery Incorporated), Scooby is able to speak in complete sentences and has more dialogue, though partially retaining his speech impediment. He consistently shows about the same level of intelligence as his friends, while also being subject to the same knack for clumsiness and moments of being dimwitted as well.

Different iterations of the character have been developed and expanded in the various series featuring the characters, many of them contradicting, such as the original series and the recent live-action films where Shaggy and Scooby first meet as older teenagers for the first time. This contradicts the animated series A Pup Named Scooby-Doo, where they know each other from almost infancy, though the films may be seen as having a different continuity altogether than the cartoon products. As an adult canine, Scooby is usually treated as a mix of a pet and a friend by his companions.

In all versions of the character, Scooby and Shaggy share several personality traits, mostly being cowardly and perpetually hungry. Yet their friends (Fred, Daphne, and Velma) encourage them to go after the costumed villains, usually with "Scooby Snacks". The biscuit-like dog treat or cookie snack is usually shaped like a bone or, in later versions of the cartoons, Scooby's dog tag. However, Scooby's inherent loyalty and courage do often force him to take a more heroic stance even without any prodding. Scooby is also extremely ticklish, and this is seen in many of the television series and films.

Scooby has a speech impediment and tends to pronounce most words as if they begin with an "R"; however, most characters are able to understand him almost perfectly. In most iterations, he keeps his sentences relatively short, usually using charades for anything longer than three or four words. His catchphrase, usually howled at the end of every production, is "Scooby-Dooby-Doo!" or "Rooby-Rooby-Roo". Scooby was voiced by Don Messick through Arabian Nights in 1994, after which point Messick quit smoking; quitting smoking changed his voice and prevented him from achieving the same raspy vocal effect (despite Messick's efforts, he suffered a career-ending stroke in 1996 and died in 1997, before any further Scooby-Doo productions were made). Messick is also known for providing the voice of the dogs Astro on The Jetsons and Muttley (who snickered). The characteristic speech impediments of Scooby and Astro are so similar that Astro's signature phrase, "Ruh-roh!", is popularly and improperly attributed to Scooby (as in "Ruh-roh, Raggy!"); of the two voices, Scooby's had a deeper and throatier timbre than Astro's.

According to Fred in Scooby-Doo: Behind the Scenes, the thought having a dog with an Adam's apple was a little strange, but they got used to it, so when he started talking, it wasn't a big deal. But despite his special gift of speech, he did have his shortcomings like his cowardice. But as Mystery Inc. bonded, he would form a special partnership with Shaggy, comparing themselves to Sherlock Holmes and Dr. Watson. Shaggy says that things just clicked and whenever the gang needs bait for a villain, they would send Shaggy and Scooby in and he says there's no one else he would rather work with. Fred claims that the only thing that scares Scooby more than monsters is a trip to the vet.

Appearance and anatomy
Scooby is brown from head to toe with several distinctive black spots on his upper body and does not seem to have a melanistic mask. He is generally a quadruped but displays bipedal 'human' characteristics occasionally. Scooby also has opposable thumbs and can use his front paws like hands. He has a black nose and wears an off-yellow, diamond-shaped-tagged blue collar with an "SD" (his initials) and has four toes on each foot. Unlike other dogs, Scooby only has one pad on each of his paws (so that it was easier to draw in the Scooby-Doo Annuals).

Scooby has a fully prehensile tail he can use to swing from or press buttons. Both his head and tail are malleable and useful as a communication aid or creating a distraction.

Creator Iwao Takamoto later explained that before he designed the character, he first spoke to a Great Dane breeder, who described to him the desirable characteristics of a pedigree dog. Takamoto then drew Scooby as the opposite of this. He said "I decided to go the opposite [way] and gave him a hump back, bowed legs, small chin and such. Even his color is wrong."

According to the official magazine that accompanied the 2002 film, Scooby is seven years old.

Voice actors
Don Messick originated the character's speech patterns and provided Scooby-Doo's voice in every Scooby-Doo production from 1969 until his retirement in 1996. Voice actor Hadley Kay voiced the character for a brief period in 1997, for two episodes of Johnny Bravo, and a few television commercials. Scott Innes (also the then-voice of Shaggy) voiced Scooby-Doo in the 1998-2001 direct-to-video films and continued to voice the character regularly for video games (such as Scooby-Doo! Night of 100 Frights), toys and some commercials until 2008. Neil Fanning provided the voice of the computer-generated Scooby-Doo in the 2002 live-action film and its 2004 sequel. Frank Welker (also the voice of Fred since 1969) has voiced Scooby since 2002, taking over beginning with What's New, Scooby-Doo? and other spin-offs including the live-action prequels Scooby-Doo! The Mystery Begins and Scooby-Doo! Curse of the Lake Monster. Dave Coulier and Seth Green have both voiced the character in Robot Chicken.

Voiced By:
 Don Messick (1969–1996)
 Frank Welker (1979, 2002–present; Scooby Goes Hollywood (as Baby Scooby-Doo), What's New, Scooby-Doo?, Sabrina the Teenage Witch, Looney Tunes: Back in Action, Shaggy & Scooby-Doo Get a Clue!, Scooby-Doo! The Mystery Begins, Scooby-Doo! Curse of the Lake Monster, Scooby-Doo! Mystery Incorporated, Batman: The Brave and the Bold, Be Cool, Scooby-Doo!, Scooby-Doo! The Museum of Mysteries, Scooby-Doo and Guess Who?, Scoob!, various direct-to-DVD films, specials, video games, and commercials)
 Rich Little (1981–1985, 1991; Canada's Wonderland live shows, Hanna-Barbera Land live shows, 1984 Macy's Thanksgiving Day Parade, Hanna-Barbera Fun!, Looking for a Home, Ice Capades)
 Keith Scott (1981, 1997; Pauls commercial, Hanna-Barbera Gala Celebrity Nite)
 Allan Melvin (1982; Yogi's Picnic)
 Bill Farmer (1985–1990; ABC Family Fun Fair)
 Greg Burson (1997; PrimeStar commercial)
 Hadley Kay (1997–1998; Johnny Bravo, commercials)
 Scott Innes (1998–2008, 2017–2020; Scooby-Doo on Zombie Island, Scooby-Doo and the Witch's Ghost, The Scooby-Doo Project, Scooby-Doo and the Alien Invaders, Scooby-Doo's Haunted Mansion, Scooby-Doo and the Cyber Chase, Harvey Birdman, Attorney at Law, Scooby-Doo! Playmobil Mini Mysteries, various video games, specials, talking toys, and commercials)
 John Nagle (2001; Scooby-Doo! in Stagefright - Live on Stage)
 David Droxler (2001; Scooby-Doo! in Stagefright - Live on Stage)
 Pierre-Marc Diennet (2001; Scooby-Doo! in Stagefright - Live on Stage)
 Kenny James (2001; phone message)
 Neil Fanning (2002-2004; Scooby-Doo, Scooby-Doo Spooky Coaster, Scooby-Doo 2: Monsters Unleashed, video game)
 J.P. Manoux (2004; Scooby-Doo 2: Monsters Unleashed (as Scooby Brainiac))
 James Arnold Taylor (2004; additional lines in Scooby-Doo 2: Monsters Unleashed)
 Marc Silk (2004–2009, 2015–present; Cartoon Network UK and Ireland bumpers, Boomerang UK and Ireland bumpers, CITV UK and Ireland bumpers, Adidas commercial, Scooby-Doo! and the Pirate Ghost - Live on Stage commercial, LEGO Scooby-Doo! commercial)
 Jeff Bergman (2004; Boomerang UK bumper)
 Danny Bage (2009; Scooby-Doo! and the Pirate Ghost - Live on Stage)
 Jess Harnell (2012; Big Top Scooby-Doo! (as Human Scooby-Doo))

Portrayed By:
 David Droxler (2001; Scooby-Doo! in Stagefright - Live on Stage)
 Pierre-Marc Diennet (2001; Scooby-Doo! in Stagefright - Live on Stage)
 Jamie Brown (2009; Scooby-Doo! and the Pirate Ghost - Live on Stage)
 Cody Collier (2013; Scooby-Doo Live! Musical Mysteries)
 Eddie Arnold (2014; Scooby-Doo Live! The Mystery Of The Pyramid)
 Joe Goldie (2016; Scooby-Doo Live! Musical Mysteries)

Voiced by in unofficial material and other languages:
 Seth MacFarlane (1999; Family Guy)
 Mark Hamill (2001; Jay and Silent Bob Strike Back)
 Dave Coulier (2005; Robot Chicken)
 Seth Green (2007–2019; Robot Chicken)
 James Arnold Taylor (2007; Drawn Together)
 Kevin Shinick (2011; Mad)
 Mikey Day (2012; Mad)
 In Brazil, the actor Orlando Drummond was the voice of Scooby-Doo for 35 years, getting into Guinness World Records as the longest serving voice actor for one character. Drummond stopped voice acting in 2015, being replaced by Reginaldo Primo. More recently, Scooby-Doo has been dubbed by Guilherme Briggs.
 In Bulgaria, Scooby-Doo has been voiced by many different actors but mostly by Radoslav Rachev and Georgi Spasov.
 In Czech Republic, Scooby-Doo is voiced by Pavel Rímský and Pavel Vondra
 In Denmark, Scooby-Doo is voiced by Lars Thiesgaard   
 In France, Scooby-Doo is voiced by Pierre Collet, Jacques Torrens, Claude Bertrand, and Eric Missoffe.
 In Finland, Scooby-Doo is voiced by Pasi Ruohonen 
 In Israel Scooby-Doo is voiced by Simcha Barbiro.
 In Italy, Scooby-Doo is voiced by Sergio Gibello, Enzo Consoli, Pietro Ubaldi and Nanni Baldini.
 In Romania, Scooby-Doo is voiced by Florian Silaghi.
 In Albania, Scooby-Doo has been voiced by Genci Fuga and Lorenc Kaja.
 In Germany, Scooby-Doo is voiced by Willi Roebke and Thomas Piper.
 In Japan, Scooby-Doo has been voiced by Kazuo Kumakura and Naomi Kusumi.
 In Hungary, Scooby-Doo was voiced first by Tibor Kristóf by early films and later Attila Hankó, in the first two seasons of The Scooby-Doo Show, and later voiced by Gabor Vass and now voiced by Gabor Melis.
 In Sri Lanka, Scooby-Doo is voiced by Gaminda Priyaviraj.
 In Spain, Scooby-Doo is voiced by David García Vázquez, José Luis Siurana and Cristopher Santana.
 In Slovakia, Scooby-Doo is voiced by Marián Slovák and Pavol Topoľský  
 In Sweden, Scooby-Doo is voiced by Stefan Frelander.
 In Norway, Scooby-Doo is voiced by Hallvard Lydvo and Svein Tindberg. 
 In Portugal, Scooby-Doo is voiced by Rui de Sá.
 In Poland, Scooby-Doo is voiced by Ryszard Olesiński in most films and by Wiktor Zborowski, Jacek Jarosz and Jan Kulczycki in '89 version of Scooby-Doo and Scrappy-Doo.
 In Russia, Scooby-Doo is voiced by Nikita Semenov-Prozorovskiy in cartoons and by Boris Bystrov in films.
 In Mexico, Scooby-Doo is voiced by Ismael Larumbe Sr., Francisco Colmenero, and Antonio Gálvez.
 In Netherlands, Scooby-Doo is voiced by Huub Dikstaal.

Appearances in other media
 Scooby-Doo and Shaggy made a non-speaking cameo in Teen Titans Go! episode, "I See You" when Cyborg and Beast Boy were rapping. Scooby later appears in the crossover episode "Cartoon Feud" along with The Scooby Gang, where Control Freak forces them to compete in Family Feud with Frank Welker reprising the role of Scooby.
 Scooby-Doo appeared twice in Cartoon Network's The Grim Adventures of Billy & Mandy as a character who is described as being on the "wrong show" along with the other principal members of Mystery Inc.
 Scooby-Doo has appeared in Johnny Bravo in the episodes "Bravo Dooby-Doo" and "'Twas the Night" during the first season, voiced both times by Hadley Kay.
 In the Yin Yang Yo! episode "Slumber Party of Doom", Scooby and Shaggy make two cameos, with the first being Shaggy complaining about Yin and Yang stealing their montages and Scooby saying, "It sucks!"
 Scooby-Doo and Shaggy made a cameo appearance in Looney Tunes: Back in Action complaining to Matthew Lillard (who played Shaggy) about his performance in the first live-action Scooby-Doo film. They both threaten to come after Lillard if he ruins the sequel. Scooby-Doo states that he will give him a "Scooby snack" and begins growling viciously.
 Scooby-Doo appears as a guest in a 1996 video called Kids for Character.
 Scooby-Doo also appears in an episode of Drawn Together, voiced by James Arnold Taylor.
 Scooby-Doo (voiced by Marc Silk) was once impersonated by David Beckham in a 2004 animated Scooby-Doo promo from the United Kingdom.
 Scooby-Doo appears in the Robot Chicken episode "Operation: Rich in Spirit", voiced by Dave Coulier (who previously imitated Scooby's voice in Full House). He is amongst Mystery Inc. members who end up killed by Jason Voorhees except Velma. Seth Green voices him in the episode "Ban on the Fun" when in the segment that spoofs Laff-A-Lympics in the style of the Munich massacre. This time, Scooby did not get killed.
 In an episode of Robotboy, when Robotboy and his mother escape from police with a big speaker, a dog that looks like Scooby hangs on to the speaker and follows them home.
 In an episode of Batman: The Brave and the Bold, this alludes to The New Scooby-Doo Movies where Batman originally starred in. However, with some meddling from Bat-Mite, not only were the dynamic duo able to fight unlike in the original appearance, but he also removed Shaggy and Scooby's cowardice allowing them to, for the first time, fight the villains toe to toe.
 In the episode "Saturday Morning Fun Pit" (7ACV19), on the Futurama series, Bender is re-conceived as a parody of Scooby-Doo, they call him Bendee Boo.
 Scooby-Doo and Shaggy make an appearance on the Sabrina the Teenage Witch live action series episode "Sabrina Unplugged".
 Scooby-Doo is a playable character alongside Shaggy in the crossover video game Lego Dimensions. His character includes a large sandwich called the "Scooby Snack". Frank Welker reprises the role.
 Scooby-Doo makes a cameo in the 1988 Disney film Oliver & Company. During the song "Perfect Isn't Easy", he appears on a black-and-white photo at the right front of Georgette's portrait collection.
 Scooby-Doo also appears in the 2021 film Space Jam: A New Legacy. His design is the same from the 2020 film, Scoob!.

Reception
Casey Kasem, the original voice actor for Shaggy Rogers, said that Scooby is "the star of the show—the Shaquille O'Neal of the show." Kasem explained, "People love animals more than they love people. Am I right or wrong? They give more love to their pets than they give to people. Scooby is vulnerable and lovable and not brave, and very much like the kids who watch. But like kids, he likes to think that he's brave."

See also

 William Hanna
 Joseph Barbera
 List of fictional dogs

References

Comedy film characters
Fictional amateur detectives
Fictional dogs
Fictional paranormal investigators
Hanna-Barbera characters
Male characters in animation
Male characters in film
Male characters in television
Scooby-Doo characters
Talking animals in fiction
Television characters introduced in 1969